Househusbands of Hollywood  was a Fox Reality Channel series that documented the lives of five househusbands and their wives and families.

The Cast
Billy Ashley, a former major league baseball player who is married to a celebrity makeup artist. 
Danny Barclay, an unemployed actor whose wife is an attorney. 
Darryl M. Bell,  an actor from the television series A Different World whose girlfriend is actress Tempestt Bledsoe.
Charlie Mattera, an actor/screenwriter and "gentlemen bandit" is married to a celebrity psychologist.
Grant Reynolds a former United States Marine Corps sniper married to TV personality Jillian Reynolds.

Episodes

External links

References

2009 American television series debuts
2009 American television series endings
2000s American reality television series
Television shows set in Los Angeles